Brione (in local dialect: Briü) is a  former comune, now a frazione of Borgo Chiese in Trentino, northern Italy.

References

External links
 Homepage of the city

Cities and towns in Trentino-Alto Adige/Südtirol